Death and the Maiden is a 1994 mystery drama film directed by Roman Polanski and starring Sigourney Weaver, Ben Kingsley and Stuart Wilson. It was based on the 1990 play of the same name by Ariel Dorfman, who also co-wrote the screenplay with Rafael Yglesias.

Plot 
Paulina Escobar (Weaver) is a housewife married to a prominent lawyer in an unnamed South American country, which is implied to be Chile. One day, a storm forces her husband Gerardo (Wilson) to ride home with a charming stranger, Dr. Miranda (Kingsley), while the power at his home is cut. Paulina is convinced that Miranda was part of the old regime and that he tortured and raped her for weeks while she was blindfolded. She takes him captive to determine the truth. Despite attempts by both her husband and Miranda to convince her that he is innocent, Paulina is certain that he is guilty and forces her husband to act as Miranda's "attorney" in the "trial" she arranges for him.

Miranda conspires with Gerardo to agree to a false confession, as Paulina states that this is all she wants in exchange for Miranda's life. They write up a false confession and present it to Paulina, but she becomes enraged and deems Miranda unrepentant, threatening to kill him. As Gerardo tries to stop her, Miranda gets hold of Paulina's gun and threatens to kill her if he is not freed. However, as he advances toward the door, the power in the house turns on, and Paulina hits him, regaining control.

In a last-ditch effort to save his life, Miranda implores Gerardo to call the Spanish medical school where he claims to have been at the time of Paulina's rape. She leads him blindfolded out of the door to the edge of the cliff. Gerardo contacts the school, where Miranda's colleague seems to confirm the story. He races to inform Paulina, now convinced that Miranda is innocent. However, Paulina refuses to believe it, stating that doctors at that time created alibis to conceal their identities. Miranda finally tells them that he really was the doctor, that he enjoyed brutalizing Paulina, and that he was sorry that the old regime fell.

Enraged, Gerardo attempts to throw Miranda from the cliff, only to realize he cannot bring himself to take a life. Paulina apparently accepts the confession, and they both leave Miranda on the cliff as he stares down at the water. The camera simulates someone falling off the cliff from his own point of view. In the final scene, Paulina and Gerardo are at the same concert where the film began with Miranda also present, looking down with his wife and sons. Paulina and Miranda cast uncomfortable glances at each other, and Miranda looks away. Miranda glances down at the couple again as the camera shows Gerardo glancing up towards the balcony at the now off-screen Miranda.

Cast 
 Sigourney Weaver as Paulina Escobar
 Ben Kingsley as Dr. Roberto Miranda
 Stuart Wilson as Gerardo Escobar

Production 
Roman Polanski said he greatly enjoyed making the film. Producer Bonnie Timmermann, who had worked with Polanski on three other films, was pleased to say that he was ahead of schedule and praised Polanski's work calling it "his best movie since 'Tess'.

Music 
A central motif is Schubert's string quartet in D minor, which is known as the "Death and the Maiden" Quartet.  A recording of this quartet was played during Paulina's rape.

Reception

Critical reception
On Rotten Tomatoes the film has a "Certified Fresh" approval rating of 82% based on reviews from 50 critics. On Metacritic it has a score of 72% based on reviews from 19 critics, indicating "generally favorable reviews".

Roger Ebert of the Chicago Sun-Times gave it three out of four stars, writing: "Death and the Maiden is all about acting. In other hands, even given the same director, this might have been a dreary slog."

Box office
The film grossed $3 million in the United States and Canada and an estimated $8 million worldwide.

References

External links 
 
 
 

1990s mystery drama films
1994 drama films
1994 films
American mystery drama films
British mystery drama films
British films based on plays
American films based on plays
Films about Latin American military dictatorships
Films directed by Roman Polanski
French mystery drama films
Fictional duos
Films set in South America
Films shot in Chile
Rape and revenge films
Films scored by Wojciech Kilar
English-language French films
1990s English-language films
1990s American films
1990s British films
1990s French films